Ahmadabad-e Rashti (also Romanized as Aḩmadābād-e Rashtī and Aḩmadābād Rashtī; also known as Aḩmadābād) is a village in Garizat Rural District, Nir District, Taft County, Yazd Province, Iran. At the 2006 census, its population was 58, in 20 families.

References 

Populated places in Taft County